Fitzroy is a former railway station which was on a branch of the Inner Circle line in Melbourne, Australia. The branch ran through the Edinburgh Gardens,  just east of the Brunswick Street Oval. The station was opened in 1888, but poor patronage led to its closure to passenger services in May 1892. The line was thereafter used only for goods trains, which lasted until 1981. The site is now occupied by a medium-density housing estate.

The last remaining part of the station, a lengthy footbridge, was dismantled and relocated to the Mornington Railway, where it has been rebuilt and restored.

References

Disused railway stations in Melbourne
Railway stations in Australia opened in 1882
Railway stations closed in 1892